Downside may refer to:

 Downside, North Somerset, a sub-district of Backwell, Somerset, England
 Downside, Somerset, a hamlet near Chilcompton in England
 Downside Abbey, a monastery in Somerset, England
 Downside School, a public school in Somerset, England
 Downside, Surrey, a small village in Surrey, England
 Downside, New South Wales, Australia

See also
Upside (disambiguation)